Medway Power Station is a 735 megawatts gas-fired power station on the Isle of Grain in Medway next to the River Medway.

History
The station is run by Scottish & Southern Energy under the name Medway Power Ltd. It was built by Marubeni (Japanese), Tarmac and Kansas City-based Black & Veatch. It was commissioned in 1995, being originally owned (25%) by Arlington, Virginia-based AES Corporation (trading as AES Electric) and the RECs SEEBOARD (37.5%) and Southern Electric (became SSE in 1998). In June 2002, American Electric Power (AEP) sold its SEEBOARD company to eDF, giving eDF 37.5% of the power station. SSE bought the plant from AES and eDF Energy for £242m on 3 October 2003. It is near (west of) to the Grain Power Station and next to the Thamesport.

, most UK gas assets have won contracts in the annual T-4 Capacity Market auctions. However, Medway has been unsuccessful in the last four.

Specification
It is a CCGT-type power station that runs on natural gas. It has two General Electric Frame 9 (9001F) gas turbines. The exhaust gas from these reaches two Nooter Eriksen heat recovery steam generators. The steam from these powers one General Electric steam turbine. During a major upgrade project in 2012 the power station benefitted from the GE DLN 2.6 install as well as an upgrade to the excitation and turbine control system. Currently the power station operates as a two-shifting plant with approximately 20MW of black start capacity.

See also

 Seabank Power Station

References

External links

 Other CCGTs in southern England

Buildings and structures in Kent
Natural gas-fired power stations in England
Power stations in South East England